
Gmina Kiełczygłów is a rural gmina (administrative district) in Pajęczno County, Łódź Voivodeship, in central Poland.

Villages
Gmina Kiełczygłów contains the villages and settlements of Beresie Duże, Beresie Małe, Brutus, Chorzew, Chruścińskie, Dąbrowa, Dryganek Duży, Dryganek Mały, Glina Duża, Glina Mała, Gumnisko, Huta, Jaworznica, Kiełczygłów, Kiełczygłówek, Kolonia Chorzew, Kolonia Kiełczygłów, Kule, Kuszyna, Ławiana, Lipie, Obrów, Okupniki, Osina Duża, Osina Mała, Otok, Pierzyny Duże, Pierzyny Małe, Podrwinów, Skoczylasy, Studzienica, Tuchań and Wyręba.

Neighbouring gminas
Gmina Kiełczygłów is bordered by the gminas of Osjaków, Pajęczno, Rusiec, Rząśnia and Siemkowice.

References
Polish official population figures 2006

Kielczyglow
Pajęczno County